SS Thomas J. Lyons was a Liberty ship built in the United States during World War II. She was named after Thomas J. Lyons.

Construction
Thomas J. Lyons was laid down on 7 April 1944, under a Maritime Commission (MARCOM) contract, MC hull 2478, by the St. Johns River Shipbuilding Company, Jacksonville, Florida; she was sponsored by Mrs. Thomas J. Lyon, the widow of the namesake, and was launched on 18 May 1944.

History
She was allocated to the Smith & Johnson Co., on 2 June 1944. On 24 December 1948, she was laid up in the National Defense Reserve Fleet, Astoria, Oregon. On 2 August 1954, she was withdrawn from the fleet to be loaded with grain under the "Grain Program 1954", she returned loaded on 12 August 1954. On 21 November 1957, she was withdrawn to be unload, she returned on empty 26 November 1957. She was sold for scrapping, 10 October 1963, to Zidell Explorations, Inc., for $45,000. She was removed from the fleet on 15 November 1963.

References

Bibliography

 
 
 
 

 

Liberty ships
Ships built in Jacksonville, Florida
1944 ships
Astoria Reserve Fleet
Astoria Reserve Fleet Grain Program